The Battle of Padmanabha occurred in Padmanabham, Visakhapatnam district (modern Andhra Pradesh, India), on 10 July 1794. This is battle between Zamindari of Vizianagaram led by Vijayram Raj II and East India Company Madras Presidency Forces led by Colonel Pendargast, on behalf of the British Governor of Madras, Sir Charles Oakly. The British emerged victoriously and the zamindar was shot dead in the middle of the battle.

As a consequence of the war, Vizianagaram was ceded to the British territories and became a tributary estate or Zamindari.

The causes of war
By 1768, the tribal areas such as Parlakimidi, Ganjam, Mohiri, Gunsuru, and Pratapagiri were ruled by 20 Zamindars. They have 34 forts and maintained approximately 35,000 armed troops. Many of these jamindars revolted against the English East India Company. Some of the castles were located in the hills of the manyam. Therefore, the defeated rebel Zamindars retreated into the Hill fortress

After the death of Ananda Gajapatiraju, Vijayaramaraju became Rajah of the Vizianagaram Zamindari. Still, he was a boy. So Sitaramaraju was appointed as divan, the son of his stepmother. When Rajah came to age, he removed Sitaramaraju from Diwani. Diwan was angered by this action, he formed an alliance with the English.

The British attempted to increase payment of peskas from Vijayanagara Zamindar and to reduce the strength of his army and ordered him to pay his dues of 8,50,000 peskas. Rajah argued that he had no dues, the British had captured Vijayanagara on 2 August 1793. British ordered that Vijayaramaraju must go to exile Masulipatnam with the pension of Rs 1200 per month. However, Vijayaramaraju refused these orders and he went to Padmanabham located between the Bhimunipatnam and Vizianagaram. The British troops defeated the Vizianagaram army and Chinavijayaramaraju died due to bullet injury in the battle.

Aftermath
After the death of Vijayaramaraju, his son Narayanababu found shelter in Makkuva village. The konda doras and sardars supported him. In the end, he made a treaty with the British and agreed to pay 5 million peskas.

After that British occupied Vijayanagara ville. But they returned Zamindari to  Narayanababu. They renewed the zamindars lands and deprived them of their unique venture. By 1802, Britishers implemented the permanent tax system in zamindaris.

References
ఆంధ్రప్రదేశ్ సమగ్రచరిత్ర, పి.వి.కె.ప్రసాదరావు, ఎమెస్కో, విజయవాడ, 2007.

Padmanabham
Visakhapatnam district
History of Andhra Pradesh
Padmanabham